Richard Dobson is an American singer-songwriter.

Richard Dobson may also refer to:

Ritchie Neville (born 1979), real name Richard Dobson, English singer
Richard Dobson (businessman), English businessman